Cregan is a surname. Notable people with the surname include:

Curtis Cregan (born 1977), American singer and actor
Dale Cregan (born 1983), convicted British drug-dealer and murderer
Denis Cregan (born 1940), Irish publican and former Fine Gael party politician
Éamonn Cregan (born 1945), Irish former Gaelic footballer, hurler and manager
George Cregan (1885–1969), Commander in the United States Navy
Jim Cregan (born 1946), English rock guitarist and bassist
John Cregan (athlete) (1878–1965), American athlete who specialised in the 800 metres
John Cregan (politician) (born 1961), former Irish Fianna Fáil politician
Martin Cregan (1788–1870), portrait painter who practised both in Dublin and London
Máirín Cregan (1891–1975), nationalist and writer in Ireland
Ned Cregan (1901–1972), Irish retired hurler who played as a left wing-forward
Pete Cregan (1875–1945), outfielder in Major League Baseball
Peter Cregan (1918–2004), Irish hurler who played as a goalkeeper
Robert Cregan (born 1988), Irish racing driver

See also
Creggan (disambiguation)